Kiratpur may refer to:

 Kiratpur, Bijnor, city and a municipal board in the Bijnor district of Uttar Pradesh, India
 Kiratpur Raja Ram, village in the Vaishali district of Bihar, India
 Kiratpur Sahib, town in Rupnagar district, Punjab, India